Natasha Borovsky (Russian: Наталья Александровна Боровская)(August 5, 1924 – May 31, 2012) was a Russian American poet and novelist. She is the author of two celebrated works of historical fiction spanning the first half of the twentieth century.  Borovsky writes about the shattering effect of war on families and the decline of the European aristocracy. Her first novel A Daughter of the Nobility  was translated into ten languages, including Russian and Polish. Her second, Lost Heritage, is a sequel with new characters, completing a drama that began during the Russian Revolution and ends at the time of the Yalta Conference.

Life
Borovsky was born in Paris to the renowned Russian pianist, Alexander Borovsky and her mother, Maria Sila-Nowicki, was of noble Polish and Russian descent. She spent winters and summers at her mother's family estate near Kazimierz Dolny, south of Warsaw. She went to school in Germany, Switzerland and France. Forced to leave France at the outset of World War II, she came with her mother to the United States where she spent two years at Sarah Lawrence College and where her extraordinary language skills landed her a job translating wartime broadcasts from around the world for CBS News.

She worked at the Office of War Information in New York City, and at the Hoover Institute, University of California, Berkeley's library and research facilities in Paris.

Borovsky married Stuart Dodds, an editor/general manager of the syndication division of the San Francisco Chronicle; they lived together in Berkeley, California.

Awards
 1986 American Book Award for A Daughter of the Nobility

Works

Poetry
 Under the rainbow: and related poems
 Drops of glass: poems, in major and minor, new forms and old Tabula Rasa Press, 1981
 Desert Spring: Poems, with sketches by Malou Knappp (1993). Berkeley, CA: Sila Nova Press. pp. 59. 
 Grasp the Subtle Lifeline with drawings by her daughter Malou.

Novels

References

External links
 "Author's website"

1924 births
2012 deaths
Sarah Lawrence College alumni
Writers from Paris
French emigrants to the United States
American women poets
20th-century American novelists
American women novelists
20th-century American women writers
20th-century American poets
American Book Award winners
Eastern Orthodox Christians from the United States
People of the United States Office of War Information
French expatriates in Poland
French expatriates in Germany
French expatriates in Switzerland
21st-century American women